Anthaxoschema is a genus of beetles in the family Buprestidae, containing the following species:

 Anthaxoschema carteri Thery, 1945
 Anthaxoschema terraereginae Obenberger, 1923

References

Buprestidae genera